Manjong station, is a railway station in Hojeo-myeon, Wonju, South Korea. It is served by the Gangneung Line. The station opened on 1 September 1942.

References

Railway stations in Gangwon Province, South Korea
Railway stations opened in 1942